Kheyrabad (also Romanized as Kheyrābād) is a village in Chenarud-e Jonubi Rural District, Chenarud District, Chadegan County, Isfahan Province, Iran. At the 2006 census, its population was 85, in 18 families.

References 

Populated places in Chadegan County